Thug Lord: The New Testament is the second solo studio album by American rapper Yukmouth. It was released on March 27, 2001 via Rap-A-Lot/Virgin Records. Production was handled by Mike Dean, 7 Aurelius, Mr. Lee, Damon Elliott, L.T. Hutton, P. Killer Trackz and Rick Rock, with J. Prince serving as executive producer. It Features guest appearances from C-Bo, Phats Bossi, CJ Mac, Kokane, Kool G Rap, Kurupt, Lil' Mo, Mac Minister, Mad Max, Nate Dogg, Outlawz, Poppa LQ and Tech N9ne. The album peaked at number 71 on the Billboard 200 and number 17 on the Top R&B/Hip-Hop Albums in the United States.

Track listing

Charts

References

External links

2001 albums
Yukmouth albums
Albums produced by Rick Rock
Albums produced by L.T. Hutton
Albums produced by Mike Dean (record producer)